Lieutenant-general Charles Powlett, 5th Duke of Bolton  (c. 1718 – 5 July 1765), styled Marquess of Winchester from 1754 to 1759, was a British soldier, nobleman and Whig politician.

Early life
He was the eldest son of Harry Powlett, 4th Duke of Bolton and Catherine Parry.

Career
Educated at Winchester, he joined the British Army and became a lieutenant-colonel in 1745. Powlett was a Groom of the Bedchamber to Frederick, Prince of Wales from 1749 until the Prince's death in 1751. He had been promoted lieutenant general by 12 March 1752, when he was made a KB.

Upon the succession of his father to the Dukedom in December 1754, he became known as Marquess of Winchester, and he left his seat at Lymington to succeed his father in Hampshire. He would remain member for that county until his succession as Duke of Bolton in 1759. On 22 December 1758, he was sworn of the Privy Council.

Personal life
Lord Bolton never married, however, he had a child with Mary Browne Banks:

 Jean Mary Browne-Powlett (–1814), who married Thomas Orde in 1778.

On 5 July 1765, Bolton died by suicide – shooting himself in the head with a pistol in his house in Grosvenor Square; "nobody knows why or wherefore," wrote Horace Walpole, "except that there is a good deal of madness in the blood".  Unmarried, Lord Bolton entailed most of his extensive estates to his illegitimate daughter, Jean Mary Browne-Powlett, in default of male issue of his younger brother Harry. When Harry died without male heirs in 1794, the Dukedom became extinct, and the inheritance passed to Thomas Orde in right of his wife. He added Powlett to his surname and was created Baron Bolton in 1797. The properties with attached farms included Bolton Hall and Bolton Castle in North Yorkshire and Hackwood Park, Old Basing, Hampshire.

Grosvenor Square
Lord Nassau Powlett, son of 2nd Duke of Bolton, had No 24 (formerly no 21), 1735–38, and the 3rd duke, and then his widow, had No 1, 1753–55. The 5th duke had No. 37 (formerly no 32) from 1759–65. For him it was extensively altered c. 1761–5 by John Vardy, (demolished in 1934). Following the 5th duke Bolton the lease holders or occupiers were the 3rd Duke of Grafton, Prime Minister, 1765; 4th Earl of Tankerville, 1769–79; Baron Alvensleben, Hanoverian Minister, c. 1780–92; 6th Duke of Bolton, 'for tenants', c. 1793–5.

References 

1710s births
1765 deaths
British Army lieutenant generals
Winchester, Charles Powlett, Marquess of
Winchester, Charles Powlett, Marquess of
Winchester, Charles Powlett, Marquess of
Knights Companion of the Order of the Bath
Knights of the Garter
Lord-Lieutenants of Hampshire
Winchester, Charles Powlett, Marquess of
Members of the Privy Council of Great Britain
Suicides by firearm in England
People educated at Winchester College
Charles
15
British politicians who committed suicide
British military personnel who committed suicide